Cinco minutos de amor ("Five Minutes of Love") is a 1941 Mexican film. It stars Carlos Orellana.

External links
 

1941 films
1940s Spanish-language films
Mexican black-and-white films
Mexican comedy-drama films
1941 comedy-drama films
1940s Mexican films